Platypus is a horizontal scrolling shooter game created and designed by Anthony Flack, produced by George Bray, and programmed by Michael W. Boeh. The objective is to guide an antique spacecraft by utilizing the mouse in order to avoid and attempt to shoot enemies.

Gameplay 

The player flies an antiquated spacecraft (the last of the fictional F-27 Platypus fleet) and attempts to defend the peaceful country of Mungola from neighboring Colossatropolis, which has become so overcrowded that its inhabitants are taking over Mungola for space and resources. The game consists of four levels, with five areas per level and a strong boss enemy that must be defeated at the end of the fifth area. The player can collect power-ups that affect the type and firing rate of the ship's weapons, equip auxiliary cannons, or double the point values of all enemies and items.

Points are scored for destroying enemies and collecting bonus coins and fruits. In addition, at the end of each area, the player receives bonus points depending on the percentage of primary targets and enemy craft destroyed. One life is lost whenever the player's ship collides with a target or is hit by enemy fire.

At the beginning of the game, the player is given a set number of credits that can be used to continue play if all lives are lost. One bonus credit is awarded for completing each of the first three levels; after the fourth is completed, the player receives a large bonus depending on the number of unused credits.

Production 

All the artwork for the game was created using a process called claymation. Flack has stated that due to limited availability of plasticine in his home country of New Zealand (at the time the game was created), he re-used the same lump of grey clay to create all the models, photographed them with a digital camera, and coloured the images in Adobe Photoshop. The music in Platypus on all platforms (except for the iPhone port) consists of various remixes of Commodore 64 game tunes by various composers, and created by several artists. They originally appeared on CDs from the C64Audio.com label, and were licensed to Idigicon Ltd. by High Technology Publishing Ltd. The current publishers for all composers whose music appeared in the game except Jonathan Dunn who is represented by Bucks Music Publishing Ltd. and who at the time was unpublished. Where possible, full credits appeared in the distributions, albeit in text file form.

As of 2019, Anthony and Claymatic Games bought the license for Platypus, including its sequel.

Releases 
Platypus was first released on CD in May 2002. It was modified and distributed online by Retro64 from January 2004 and included an easy mode and mouse support. A third build of the game (which can be distinguished as the score of Player 2 as yellow numbers and not red) included various bug fixes and was used for multiple localizations, including Chinese and Japanese versions. On November 14, 2006, Platypus saw a release for Sony's PlayStation Portable console. On March 26, 2009, it became available for download on the PlayStation Network. The game functions the same as its full PC downloadable version, but with minor changes for the PSP version, like the new screen size. On November 24, 2009, Platypus was released on Xbox Live Indie Games. On August 15, 2014, Platypus and Platypus II, were both released on Steam.

Reception 

Platypus was met with positive reception from critics.

Sequel 
In February 2007, Idigicon released Platypus II, developed by Citric Games without the involvement of the original developer.

Notes

References

External links 

 
 Platypus at GameFAQs
 Platypus at Giant Bomb
 Platypus at MobyGames

2002 video games
BlackBerry games
Clay animation video games
Cooperative video games
IOS games
MacOS games
Multiplayer and single-player video games
MumboJumbo games
Palm OS games
PlayStation Portable games
Shoot 'em ups
Single-player online games
Symbian games
Video games developed in New Zealand
Video games scored by Yannis Brown
Video games with digitized sprites
Windows games
Windows Phone games
Windows-only games
Xbox 360 games